Muehlenbeckia sagittifolia is a species of flowering plant native to South America (in northern Argentina, Uruguay, Paraguay, Bolivia and southern Brazil). Outside of its range, it has been introduced in Portugal (including the Azores and Madeira archipelagos)

References

sagittifolia